Alan Conger Morgan (March 30, 1909 – June 22, 1984) was an American sailor who competed in the 1932 Summer Olympics.

He was born in California and died in Riverside County, California.

In 1932 he was a crew member of the American boat Angelita which won the gold medal in the 8 metre class.

References

External links
 
 
 
 

1909 births
1984 deaths
American male sailors (sport)
Sailors at the 1932 Summer Olympics – 8 Metre
Olympic gold medalists for the United States in sailing
Medalists at the 1932 Summer Olympics